Manuel Ignacio de Iriondo (born 6 May 1993) is an Argentine professional footballer who plays as a midfielder for Primera Federación club Rayo Majadahonda.

Career
On 29 July 2021, de Iriondo signed a two-year contract with French Ligue 2 club Grenoble. On 26 July 2022, the contract was terminated by mutual consent. The following day, he signed for Spanish Primera Federación club Rayo Majadahonda.

References

External links
 

1993 births
Footballers from Santa Fe, Argentina
Living people
Argentine footballers
Association football midfielders
Atlético de Rafaela footballers
Unión de Santa Fe footballers
Olimpo footballers
FC Politehnica Iași (2010) players
Grenoble Foot 38 players
CF Rayo Majadahonda players
Argentine Primera División players
Primera Nacional players
Liga I players
Ligue 2 players
Argentine expatriate footballers
Argentine expatriate sportspeople in Romania
Expatriate footballers in Romania
Argentine expatriate sportspeople in France
Expatriate footballers in France
Argentine expatriate sportspeople in Spain
Expatriate footballers in Spain